Minna Turunen (born 22 April 1969 in Lahti) is a Finnish actress. Turunen graduated from the Helsinki Theatre Academy in 1994.

Turunen's son is the actor and TV host Roope Salminen.

Filmography

Television 
 Salatut elämät (2007) – Taru Saaristo
 Mogadishu Avenue (2006) – Irina Totkunen
 Haluatko filmitähdeksi? (2003) – hostess
 Klubi (1998) – Janita Westin
 Tuliportaat (1998) – Carola Jarvis
 Takaisin kotiin (1995)
 Rapman (1995)
 Kuudesti laukeava (in three episodes, 1992) – Titta Hytönen-Amin
 Ruusun aika (in five episodes, 1990–1991) – Nurse Jonna Joki

Films 
 Vares - Yksityisetsivä (2004) – Ifigenia Multanen
 Umur (2002) – Umur
 Ken tulta pyytää (2001) – Alarm centrum
 Lapin kullan kimallus (1999) – Ralla-Kaisa
 Esa ja Vesa - auringonlaskun ratsastajat (1994) – 2. receptionist
 Romanovin kivet (1993) – Interpreter
 Kotia päin (1989) – Annette

References

External links

Official website
 

Finnish actresses
People from Lahti
1969 births
Living people